José Luis Vásquez (born 1957) is a retired Peruvian professional football player and manager.

References 

1957 births
Living people
Peruvian footballers
Peruvian football managers
Place of birth missing (living people)
Association football forwards